The College Basketball Invitational (CBI) is a men's college basketball tournament created in 2007 by The Gazelle Group.  The inaugural tournament occurred after the conclusion of the 2007–08 men's college basketball regular season.  The CBI selects 16 teams that are not selected for the NCAA Tournament or the National Invitation Tournament (NIT), and who are willing to pay a $27,500 entry fee to participate.  In the CBI, prior to 2020 teams competed on home courts. After the post-COVID pandemic revival, the tournament has been staged at the Ocean Center in Daytona Beach, Florida.  The CBI is a single-elimination tournament.  Prior to 2020, the tournament was single elimination until the final two teams were determined, after which the championship was determined by a championship series with a best-two-out-of-three format.  Since the tournament's 2021 revival and adoption of the single-site format, the championship is also determined by a single game.  In 2023, the CBI introduced NIL funding of $40,000 to be distributed in the following manner: $25,000 to the Champion, $10,000 to the Runner-Up, and $2,500 to each Semifinalist.

The inaugural CBI

The 2008 College Basketball Invitational was the first new postseason tournament since the Collegiate Commissioners Association Tournament in 1974. The opening round was played on March 18, 2008, and March 19, 2008, with the second round being played on March 24, 2008. The semifinals took place on March 26, 2008. The championship was a best-of-three series with games being played on March 31, April 2, and April 4, 2008.  The bracketing was done in east, west, south and midwest regions.

Tulsa was crowned the champion in the 2008 tournament.

Television
On February 1, 2016, the CBI announced an exclusive television partnership with ESPN to broadcast the Championship Series of the CBI.  In the inaugural year, games were available in local markets on Fox Sports Net and DirecTV. The games could also be viewed on the official website. The 2009 tournament broadcast was changed to HDNet with four first-round games, two quarterfinal games, both semifinal games, and all three championship games being broadcast. HDNet changed its name to AXS and aired the 2013 tournament. CBS Sports Network televised the 2014 and 2015 tournaments. ESPNU televised the best-of-three Championship Series from 2016 to 2019, and again in 2021.

The following is an overview and list of the announcers and television networks to broadcast the tournament.

Champions

Presenting sponsors
2008–2010: none
2011–2012: Zebra Pen
2013: Buick
2014–2016: none
2017: Five Four
2019, 2021–2022: Roman
2023–present: Discount Tire

See also
Women's Basketball Invitational

References

External links
 

 
College men's basketball competitions in the United States
Postseason college basketball competitions in the United States
Recurring sporting events established in 2008